The occipital lymph nodes, one to three in number, are located on the back of the head close to the margin of the trapezius and resting on the insertion of the .

Their afferent vessels drain the occipital region of the scalp, while their efferents pass to the superior deep cervical glands.

Additional images

Etymology 

References

External links
 
 http://www.patient.info
 http://www.emedicine.com/ent/topic306.htm#section~anatomy_of_the_cervical_lymphatics

Lymphatics of the head and neck